The Norwegian Society of Engineers and Technologists (NITO) is the largest union in engineering in Norway with approximately 90 000 members. NITO has 21 regional branches covering the country and over 2,000 local clubs and shop stewards. Most of the working members are affiliated to a local club. The local clubs or workshops are organisationally placed directly under the regional branches. With a few exceptions the branches follow Norway's county borders.

NITO was established in 1936 and is an independent, non-affiliated, and non-political union.

NITO is led by a Board of Representatives. The daily work of the union is carried out by shop stewards and elected union representatives at different organisational levels; by the secretariat and main office in Oslo, consisting of the general secretary and 75 employees; and by the 23 employees who run the branch offices.

Presidents and Secretaries General
Presidents
 Frithjof Svendsen (1936–1937)
 Einar I. Larsen (1937–1941)
 Arne G. Myhrvold (1941–1948)
 Brynil Brynjulfsen (1948–1952)
 Erling Willoch (1952–1954)
 Arne H. Johansen (1954–1968)
 Trygve Hanæs (1968–1975)
 Lars Harlem (1975–1979)
 Harald Skuggedal (1979–1983)
 Gunnar Hamre (1983–1987)
 Jan Abrahamsen (1987–1990)
 Svein Erik Andresen (1990–1995)
 Svein Vikhals (1995–1998)
 Roger Johansen (1998–2000)
 John A. Haugen (2000–2003)
 Marit Stykket (2003–2012)
 Trond Markussen (fra 2012)

Secretaries General
 Modolf Guttelvik (1945–1946)
 Oddvar de Lange (1946–1950)
 Knut Reistad (konstituert) (1950–1951)
 Trygve Sommerhein (1951–1968)
 Erik Bjore (1968–1981)
 Anth. B. Nilsen (1981–1992)
 Erik Prytz (1992–2011)
 Steinar Sørlie (fra 2011)

Honorary Members

References

External links
 Norges Ingeniør- og Teknologorganisasjon
 Ingeniørenes stemme
 Bioingeniørfaglig institutt
 NITO Studentene
 NITO Lederforum

Science and technology in Norway
Trade unions in Norway
1936 establishments in Norway
Trade unions established in 1936